Gora is a small settlement in the hills northeast of Begunje in the Municipality of Cerknica in the Inner Carniola region of Slovenia.

References

External links 

Gora on Geopedia

Populated places in the Municipality of Cerknica